Let Your Love Out is American child actor Luke Benward's first EP, released by iShine Music on January 5, 2009.

Track listing

References

2009 EPs